María León (born 7 April 1967) is a Cuban former basketball player who competed in the 1992 Summer Olympics, in the 1996 Summer Olympics, and in the 2000 Summer Olympics.

References

1967 births
Living people
Cuban women's basketball players
Olympic basketball players of Cuba
Basketball players at the 1992 Summer Olympics
Basketball players at the 1996 Summer Olympics
Basketball players at the 2000 Summer Olympics